WFCB-LP (100.7 FM) is a community radio station in Ferndale, Michigan, owned by Ferndale Radio, Incorporated, formerly known as Underwood V Radio, Incorporated (pronounced "Underwood Five Radio"), having launched in 2016. Ferndale Radio was created by five friends who have a strong passion for music and missed the freedom and creative expression of college radio. The studio and tower is located in the heart of Ferndale at the Rust Belt Market. The station covers the immediate Ferndale and Royal Oak areas, as well as portions of Detroit's North End.  The station is a non profit 501c 3 run completely by volunteers and supported by donations and local underwriters.

The station's application was confirmed as acceptable by Industry Canada for coordination purposes under NARBA, on July 25, 2014, and its construction permit was granted on August 7, 2014. Due to its proximity and frequency, the station is subject to interference from nearby CKUE-FM-1 in Windsor, Ontario, which broadcasts at a substantially higher power (3.84 kW) from a tower very close to the Canada–United States border.

In 2020 and 2021, the station started raising funds for online streaming. Ferndale Project, a local brewery in Ferndale, brewed a Ferndale Radio beer and part of the proceeds were donated to their streaming efforts. Ferndale Radio is on track to start streaming at the start of 2022.

External links
 Official website of their Indiegogo campaign
 Facebook page Facebook
 2021 PR Newswire - Lick the Plate joins Ferndale Radio
Underwood V Radio website - Ferndale Radio Website
2018 Metromode - Ferndale Radio brings hyperlocal focus to the airwaves
 2018 Macomb Daily - Ferndale Radio puts Community First
 Instagram
 2020 Ferndale Friends - Ferndale Radio Keeping Ferndale Groovy
  2017 Free Press - Super Local Radio Puts Community First

FCB-LP
Radio stations established in 2017
2017 establishments in Michigan
FCB-LP
Community radio stations in the United States